The 1994 Ottawa municipal election was held on November 14, 1994, in Ottawa, Canada. The number of wards in the city had been reduced from 15 to 10 for this election. Mayor Jacquelin Holzman was re-elected in a three-way contest with councillors Joan O'Neill and Tim Kehoe.

Mayoral election

City council

Ottawa Board of Education Trustees
The results for the Ottawa Board of Education trustees were as follows. This would be the final election for the OBE, which was merged with the Carleton Board of Education in 1998.

References

Sources

Municipal elections in Ottawa
1994 Ontario municipal elections
1990s in Ottawa